"The Coast Is Always Changing" was the first single released by Maxïmo Park and features on their debut album A Certain Trigger. It reached number 121 in the UK charts in 2004.

The music video for the single was filmed in a small pub in Newcastle-upon-Tyne called The Head Of Steam at a gig they played there in September 2004. They played a special intimate show in the same small venue (90 capacity) in January 2007.

Track listing 
CD WAP 183 CD, 7" 7WAP 183
 "The Coast Is Always Changing" – 3:19
 "The Night I Lost My Head" – 1:51

External links
The Coast Is Always Changing lyrics
The Night I Lost My Head lyrics

2004 singles
Maxïmo Park songs
Songs written by Paul Smith (rock vocalist)
Songs written by Duncan Lloyd
Song recordings produced by Paul Epworth
2004 songs
Warp (record label) singles